Bribie Island Coaches was an Australian bus operator on Bribie Island. It operated five services under contract to the Government of Queensland under the Translink banner. In July 2020 the business was purchased by Caboolture Bus Lines and the brand retired.

History
Originally owned by Barry Muir and trading as Bribie Island Bus & Coaches, in 1997 the business was sold to former Picton Omnibus Service proprietor George Lee and renamed Bribie Island Coaches. In March 2009 the business was sold to Ballarat operator Des Trotter. In July 2020 the business was sold to Caboolture Bus Lines and the brand retired.

Services
At the time of its cessation, Bribie Island Coaches operated five routes.

Fleet
As at July 2020, the fleet consisted of 25 buses.

References

External links

Showbus gallery

Bus companies of Queensland
Public transport in Brisbane
Transport companies disestablished in 2020
2020 disestablishments in Australia